Alvin Jay Jolley (September 29, 1899 – August 26, 1948) was a professional football player and coach. He played for the Cleveland Tigers, Akron Pros, Dayton Triangles, Oorang Indians, Buffalo Bisons, Brooklyn Dodgers and the Cleveland Indians. He was a coach for the Bisons and the Cincinnati Reds. He also played for the Ironton Tanks of the Ohio League.

Jolley was also a Native American. He was a member of the Wyandotte Nation. This made him eligible to join the  NFL's Oorang Indians. The Indians were a team based in LaRue, Ohio, composed only of Native Americans, and coached by Jim Thorpe.

Coaching
In 1929 Jolley coached the Bisons in a season that saw the team winning just one game. Afterwards the team finally folded for good, making Jolley the franchise's last coach. Jolley coached the Dodgers in the first ever NFL night game held on Wednesday September 24, 1930, in Portsmouth, Ohio. The Dodgers lost game 12-0 to the Portsmouth Spartans, the forerunners to the modern day Detroit Lions.

Head coaching record

References

Additional sources
 
 Uniform Numbers of the NFL

1899 births
1948 deaths
American football tackles
Akron Pros players
Brooklyn Dodgers (NFL) players
Buffalo Bisons (NFL) coaches
Buffalo Bisons (NFL) players
Cincinnati Reds (NFL) coaches
Cincinnati Reds (NFL) players
Cleveland Indians (NFL 1931) players
Cleveland Tigers (NFL) players
Dayton Triangles players
Oorang Indians players
Kansas State Wildcats football players
Tulsa Golden Hurricane football players
People from Pottawatomie County, Kansas
Players of American football from Kansas
Native American sportspeople